Brad Simpson may refer to:

 Brad Simpson (racewalker), Australian athlete, silver 5000 metres walk medallist at the 2010 Oceania Youth Athletics Championships
 Brad Simpson (producer) (born 1973), American filmmaker and executive producer 
 Brad Simpson (journalist), American journalist, joint winner of the Investigative Reporters and Editors Award for syndicated TV News in 2008
 Brad Simpson (singer) (born 1995), English singer, lead vocalist for The Vamps
 Brad Simpson (swimmer), Australian swimmer, bronze 100 m breaststroke medallist at the 1987 Australian Swimming Championships